The Indian locomotive class WCG-1 is a class of 1.5 kV DC electric locomotives that was developed in late 1920s by Vulcan Foundry and Swiss Locomotive and Machine Works (SLM for Indian Railways. The model name stands for broad gauge (W), Direct Current (C), Freight traffic (G) engine, 1st generation (1). They entered service in 1930. A total of 41 WCG-1 was built at England between 1928 and 1929.

The WCG-1 served both passenger and freight trains for over 72 years. With the introduction of more modern types of locomotives and 25 KV AC electrification, all were withdrawn by early 2000s. Today 2 locomotives are preserved with rest of the units being scrapped.

History 
The locomotives were ordered in 1926. The mechanical part of the first 10 locomotives was built by SLM in Winterthur, the rest of 31 at Vulcan Foundry in Newton-le-Willows. The electrical part of all 41 locomotives was built by Metrovick based on drawings by BBC from Baden AG. These were the first electric locomotives built by Vulcan Foundry.

The locomotives were used in front of freight trains on GIPR's Bombay-Pune and Bombay-Igatpuri routes, but also had the task of pushing trains on the up to 3% steep Bhor Ghat ramp. They were referred to by the staff as खेकडा [Khēkaḍā], English 'crab', and proved themselves with their good cornering ability on the mountain range. It is often mentioned that the locomotives made a strange moaning sound when standing and made a wiping sound when driving, which was typical for most crocodile locomotives.

From 1974 the WCG-1 were only used in shunting in Bombay and Lonavla, where the last locomotives were still in use in 1992. In Bombay they were located in the Wadi Bunder depot near the Bombay Victoria terminus and were mainly used to put together passenger trains.

The first locomotive was called Sir Leslie Wilson, who was governor of Bombay from 1923 to 1928. The name tag is attached to locomotive no. 4502 on display in the National Rail Museum of India.

Specification 
Data sheet of the SLM - 3 pages with photo and technical data

The total weight of the locomotive was 123 t, of which 72.25 t was for the mechanical part and 50.75 t for the electrical part.

The locomotive has two bogies with three coupled axles, which were driven by an SLM inclined rod drive. The drive axle was the third axle in the bogie, the drive was from a double drive motor via a blind shaft, which is arranged between axes 1 and 2, on the drive and coupling rods. The two powered bogies, on which the pulling and pushing devices were also attached, had lower structures in which the traction motors and the reversing switches were housed. The locomotive box with the two cabs connected the two powered bogies. The locomotive was able to drive arches with a radius of 500 ft (152 m).

The 650 HP traction motors had winding designed for 1500 V. The following groupings were possible:all four motors connected in series and two motors in series connection in parallel to the other two motors in series connection all traction motors in parallel. The electro-pneumatic control had nine speed levels - three in each grouping. There was also an electric useful brake that worked in the speed range from 8 mph (12.8 m / h) to 35 mph (56 km / h). The excitation of the traction motors was ensured by an axle generator.

The locomotive was equipped with a vacuum brake for the wagon train, the brake of the locomotive itself being designed as a vacuum-controlled compressed air brake. There were two vacuum pumps and two piston compressors, the compressors being driven by 1500 V motors supplied directly with the contact line voltage. The sand spreaders working with compressed air discharge could be operated via a pedal. The pantographs could be raised and lowered using a manually operated compressed air valve. A compressed air pipe was available as an acoustic warning device.

Preserved Examples

Former shed 

 Wadi Bunder: All the locomotives of this class has been withdrawn from service.

Books

See also

Rail transport in India#History
Indian Railways
Locomotives of India
Rail transport in India

References

External links

http://www.irfca.org/faq/faq-specs.html#WCG-1

India railway fan club

Electric locomotives of India
1500 V DC locomotives
Railway locomotives introduced in 1928
5 ft 6 in gauge locomotives
Vulcan Foundry locomotives